The Adventures of PC 49 is a 1949 British crime film directed by Godfrey Grayson, starring Hugh Latimer, John Penrose and Annette D. Simmonds.

It is also known by the subtitle Investigating the Case of the Guardian Angel. The film was based on a popular radio series. It was followed by a sequel, A Case for PC 49, in 1951.

There were six children's annuals full of stories of PC 49, as well as an annual reprinting of his strips in the Eagle comics.

Cast
 Hugh Latimer as P.C. Archibald Berkeley-Willoughby 
 John Penrose as Barney  
 Annette D. Simmonds as Carrots  
 Pat Nye as Ma Benson  
 Patricia Cutts as Joan Carr  
 Michael Ripper as Fingers  
 Martin Benson as Skinny Ellis 
 Arthur Brander as Inspector Wilson  
 Eric Phillips as Sergeant Wright  
 Billy Thatcher as Ted Burton 
 Arthur Lovegrove as Bill  
 Jim O'Brady as Lorry Driver

References

Bibliography
 Chibnall, Steve & McFarlane, Brian. The British 'B' Film. Palgrave MacMillan, 2009.

External links

1949 films
British crime films
1949 crime films
Films directed by Godfrey Grayson
Films set in England
Films based on radio series
Films about police officers
Hammer Film Productions films
1940s police films
1940s police procedural films
British police films
British black-and-white films
1940s English-language films
1940s British films